Ettinghausen is an Ortsgemeinde – a community belonging to a Verbandsgemeinde – in the Westerwaldkreis in Rhineland-Palatinate, Germany.

Geography

The community lies in the Westerwald between Montabaur and Hachenburg. The community belongs to the Verbandsgemeinde of Wallmerod, a kind of collective municipality.

History
In 1367, Ettinghausen had its first recorded mention, as Ittincusen.

Politics

The municipal council is made up of 8 council members who were elected in a majority vote in a municipal election on 7 June 2009.

Economy and infrastructure

Running right through the community is Bundesstraße 255 linking Montabaur and Herborn. The nearest Autobahn interchange is Montabaur on the A 3 (Cologne–Frankfurt), some 10 km away. The nearest InterCityExpress stop is the railway station at Montabaur on the Cologne-Frankfurt high-speed rail line.

References

External links
Ettinghausen 

Municipalities in Rhineland-Palatinate
Westerwaldkreis